The 1979 Jacksonville State Gamecocks football team represented Jacksonville State University as a member of the Gulf South Conference (GSC) during the 1979 NCAA Division II football season. Led by third-year head coach Jim Fuller, the Gamecocks compiled an overall record of 4–6 with a mark of 1–5 in conference play, and finished tied for sixth in the GSC.

Schedule

References

Jacksonville State
Jacksonville State Gamecocks football seasons
Jacksonville State Gamecocks football